Live at Carnegie Hall may refer to:

Live at Carnegie Hall 1963, Bob Dylan's six-song live set
Live at Carnegie Hall (Al Hirt album), a 1965 live album
Live at Carnegie Hall 1970, a live album by Jethro Tull
Live at Carnegie Hall (Dory Previn album), 1973
Live at Carnegie Hall (Bill Withers album), 1973
Live at Carnegie Hall, a 1973 gospel album by Andraé Crouch
Live at Carnegie Hall (Renaissance album), 1976
Live at Carnegie Hall, a 1978 live album by jazz saxophonist Dexter Gordon
Live at Carnegie Hall (Liza Minnelli album), 1981
Live at Carnegie Hall, a 1988 live album by The Winans
Live at Carnegie Hall, a 1988 live album by Sweet Honey in the Rock
Live at Carnegie Hall (Stevie Ray Vaughan album), a 1997 release of a 1984 recording
Live at Carnegie Hall (Anoushka Shankar album), 2001
Live at Carnegie Hall, a 2001 comedy album by Ray Romano
Live at Carnegie Hall, a 2003 comedy album by David Sedaris
Live at Carnegie Hall (David Byrne and Caetano Veloso album), 2012, recorded in 2004
Live at Carnegie Hall (Ryan Adams album),  2015
Live at Carnegie Hall (Dan Fogelberg album), 2017, recorded 1979
Live at Carnegie Hall: An Acoustic Evening, a 2017 live album by Joe Bonamassa
Live at Carnegie Hall, a 2019 live album by Billy Joel, recorded in 1977 
Word: Live at Carnegie Hall, a 2012 live album by Louis C.K.

See also
At Carnegie Hall (disambiguation)
Carnegie Hall Concert (disambiguation)